True Golf Classics: Pebble Beach Golf Links is a traditional golf simulation video game that was originally released in 1992 for the Super Nintendo Entertainment System. It was eventually released in 1993 to the Sega Genesis and the NEC PC-9801. It is part of T&E Soft's True Golf series.

The game takes place at the prestigious Pebble Beach Golf Links in Pebble Beach, California.

Gameplay
The golfing engine is very complex and it takes many button pushes on the game pad in order to deliver a single stroke. There is match play, stroke play, and a tournament mode. Anywhere from one to four players can play at once.

Notes

References

1992 video games
Golf video games
NEC PC-9801 games
Sega Genesis games
Super Nintendo Entertainment System games
T&E Soft games
Video games developed in Japan
Video games set in California
Multiplayer and single-player video games